Apaxtla de Castrejón is a city and seat of Apaxtla Municipality, in the state of Guerrero, south-western Mexico.

References

Populated places in Guerrero